The Mission Bay Yacht Club is a private yacht club located in San Diego, California, on the west side of Mission Bay.

The club hosted the Snipe World Championships in 1997 and the club's Snipe fleet won the Commodore Hub E. Isaacks Trophy in 1969, 1971 and 1981.

Fleets 
The club is home of the following One-Design racing fleets:
505 
Finn
Laser
Lido 14
Lightning
MC Scow
Sabot
Snipe
Soling
Sunfish
Thistle
Victory
29er

Junior Program Sailboats 
CFJ
C420
Naples Sabot
O'PEN Skiff
ILCA Dinghy (Laser)

Sailors 
Caleb Paine, Briana Provancha, Brian Vanderspek and Maureen McKinnon-Tucker are MBYC members.

References

External links 
 Official Website
 Juniors Website

1927 establishments in California
Sailing in California
Sports in San Diego
Yacht clubs in the United States